Jimmy Engineer (born August 1954, Loralai, Balochistan) is a Pakistani artist, social worker, philanthropist and stamp designer.

He is a Zoroastrian. His father and grandfather were engineers, and following Zoroastrian tradition, took the family name "Engineer".

Early life and education
Engineer completed his schooling from St. Anthony's High school, Lahore. He spent three years at National College of Arts (NCA), Lahore. He then moved to Karachi where he is still based.

Beliefs
Engineer is a firm believer in the teachings of the Sufis, Data Ganj Bakhsh and Barkat Ali.

Artist
He became a professional artist in 1976.

He has made over 2000 paintings, 1000 calligraphies and about 20,000 prints which are in private collections around the world including China, India, Pakistan, Russia, the UK and US. Amongst his famous works is the one depicting the independence of Pakistan which can be seen at the National Art Gallery in Islamabad.

Stamp design
He designed a number of stamps including the four-stamp, se-tenant issue depicting the independence of Pakistan in 2000.

Honours and awards
 2009: Honorary citizen of Houston, Texas.

References

External links
 
 Artist Interview Nigaah – Arts and culture. Retrieved 4 August 2010.

Pakistani artists
Pakistani stamp designers
Parsi people
Pakistani Zoroastrians
Living people
1954 births
National College of Arts alumni
People from Loralai District
Pakistani calligraphers
Artists from Karachi
St. Anthony's High School, Lahore alumni